Baronius Press is a traditional Catholic book publisher. It was founded in London, in 2002 by former St Austin Press editor Ashley Paver and other young Catholics who had previously worked in publishing and printing. The press takes its name from the cardinal Cesare Baronius, a Neapolitan ecclesiastical historian who lived from 1538 to 1607. Its logo is a biretta, which together with a cassock forms the traditional image of a Catholic priest.

History and publications
The original objective of Baronius Press was to raise the quality of traditional Catholic books in order to make them more appealing to a wider audience. Baronius Press aimed to achieve this goal by retypesetting classic Catholic books (rather than republishing facsimiles) and binding them using high quality coverings such as leather. The advantages of retypesetting are clearer text and the ability to use modern layouts.

The first publication of the Baronius Press was a new edition of the Douay–Rheims Bible. This was significant because no digitally typeset edition had been previously released. A pocket edition and a Psalms and New Testament edition followed, and, in 2007, a giant size format was added to the range. In 2008, their range of Bibles was expanded by a parallel Douay–Rheims / Clementine Vulgate, which includes the appendix to the Old Testament which contains the Prayer of Manasseh, 3 Esdras, and 4 Esdras.

In 2004, Baronius Press published a new 1962 missal in cooperation with the Priestly Fraternity of St. Peter, bearing an imprimatur from Bishop Fabian Wendelin Bruskewitz, for use at the traditional Roman mass. This was the first missal intended for use at the traditional mass with an imprimatur to be published in more than 35 years. A new edition coinciding with Pope Benedict XVI's 2007 motu proprio Summorum Pontificum was named the Motu Proprio edition of the 1962 Missal. It was noted in several Catholic newspapers and journals that it is currently the only 1962 Missal being published with a valid imprimatur.

Later in 2004, Baronius released a series of leather bound Catholic classics with the aim of expanding its range. By the end of 2006, the company had over 40 titles in print with the release of a new paperback series called Christian Classics.

Baronius published a new edition of the Little Office of the Blessed Virgin Mary that contained all of the relevant Gregorian chants in October 2007. It was the first book to contain the complete music for the office. Websites complained that it contained several minor errors, and a revised edition correcting these was published at the end of 2008. In April 2012, its much anticipated Latin-English Roman Breviary was published, having been granted an imprimatur by Bishop Fabian Bruskewitz. Both the Breviary and the Little Office published by Baronius conform to the editio typica of the Breviary of 1961.

In October 2012, a complete edition of the Bible translated by Ronald Knox was published, with endorsements from Cardinal Cormac Murphy-O'Connor, Archbishop Vincent Nichols, and Anglican Archbishop Rowan Williams.

In 2017 Baronius published an updated edition of Ludwig Ott's Fundamentals of Catholic Dogma. This edition was edited by Robert Fastiggi, who also translated the latest edition of Denzinger's Enchiridion Symbolorum into English, incorporating a better translation of the German edition (including changes made by Ott himself after the Second Vatican Council), correcting some errors that had appeared in earlier English versions, and included references to Denzinger and the Catechism of the Catholic Church. It received an Imprimatur from Bishop Malcolm McMahon of Liverpool, United Kingdom and a foreword by Bishop Athanasius Schneider of Astana, Kazakhstan.

Legal matters

Baronius Press, Ltd. v. Saint Benedict Press, LLC
On 29 September 2016, Baronius filed a civil lawsuit against TAN Books, a North Carolina-based Catholic publisher, and its parent company, Saint Benedict Press. The lawsuit alleged that TAN had violated Baronius's ownership of the copyright for the English translation of Ludwig Ott's Fundamentals of Catholic Dogma (Grundriß der katholischen Dogmatik in the original German) by reprinting the book in the United States following Baronius's 2009 purchase of the rights to the English translation from the original copyright holders. The English translation of Fundamentals had been in the public domain in the United States since its initial publication in 1954, as U.S. copyright law in effect at the time did not provide automatic copyright protection to works initially published in foreign countries (the English translation of Fundamentals was originally published in Ireland). TAN began reprinting the English translation in 1974 under the assumption that Fundamentals was, in fact, a public domain work in the U.S. TAN ceased publication of Fundamentals in 1996 following the possibility that the book had acquired copyrighted status in the United States as a restored work on 1 January 1996 under the Uruguay Round Agreements Act. TAN elected to reprint again Fundamentals in 2013 in hardcover, prompting Baronius to file suit against Saint Benedict Press for copyright violation.

The lawsuit was settled on 25 March 2019. As a result of the settlement, TAN/SBP was forced to cease publication not only of Fundamentals, but also other works it had published to which Baronius had subsequently acquired the exclusive English-language rights, including Francois Trochu's Saint Bernadette Soubirous and The Sermons of the Curé d'Ars and numerous works by Reginald Garrigou-Lagrange.

Hardback book list
 Douay–Rheims Bible
 Msgr Knox's Translation of the Vulgate Bible
 1962 Roman Rite Missal (motu proprio edition)
 1961 Latin-English Roman Breviary
 1961 Little Office of the Blessed Virgin
 Rule of Saint Benedict by St Benedict
 Dark Night of the Soul by St John of the Cross
 The Way of Perfection by St Teresa of Ávila
 The Story of a Soul by St Thérèse of Lisieux
 True Devotion to the Blessed Virgin Mary by St Louis de Montfort
 Dolorous Passion by Blessed Anne Catherine Emmerich
 Meditations and Devotions by St John Henry Newman
 Imitation of Christ by Thomas à Kempis
 The Holy Mass by Dom Prosper Guéranger
 Apologetics and Catholic Doctrine by Archbishop Michael Sheehan
 The Catechism of the Council of Trent
 Fundamentals of Catholic Dogma by Ludwig Ott
 The Baltimore Catechism (Numbers 1-4)

References

External links
 Baronius Press

Book publishing companies of the United Kingdom
Christian publishing companies
Catholic media
Publishing companies established in 2003
Catholic publishing companies